The 2017 Audi Sport TT Cup was the third and the final season of the Audi Sport TT Cup. It began on 6 May at Hockenheim and finished on 15 October at Hockenheim after seven double-header meetings, all of which were support events for the Deutsche Tourenwagen Masters and 24 Hours Nürburgring.

Drivers

Race calendar and results

Championship standings
Scoring system
Points were awarded to the top eighteen classified finishers as follows:

Drivers' championship

Non-Championship 'Legends Race'
At the final round of the championship in Hockenheim, a non-championship "Legends Race" took place in which drivers with 'legendary' connections took over the series regulars' cars for a 12 lap race.

References

External links
 

Audi Sport TT Cup seasons
Audi Sport TT Cup